Sinumelon bednalli is a species of air-breathing land snail, a terrestrial pulmonate gastropod mollusk in the family Camaenidae. This species is endemic to Australia.

References

Gastropods of Australia
bednalli
Vulnerable fauna of Australia
Gastropods described in 1904
Taxonomy articles created by Polbot